The Gedikpaşa Tiyatrosu was an Ottoman theatre established in Istanbul in 1866. It was the first theatre in the Ottoman Turkey where plays were performed by Turkish actors, whereas previous theatres in the Ottoman Empire had only employed Western travelling theatre troupes or non-Muslim Ottoman people such as Armenians.

"With its regular Turkish performances, location, and broader audience, Gedikpaşa
Theatre was one of the most important theatres established during the Tanzimat period. The first
muslim-Turkish actors performed in Gedikpaşa Theatre and the famous writers of the period
were composing plays for the theatre. Significantly, the theatre was not located in the Pera
district, historically known as a neighbourhood in which mostly foreigners resided; instead, it
was midway between Çarşıkapı and Beyazıt towards the sea. The Beyazıt area was a centre
mostly occupied by local Turks’ residences and businesses (And 1972, 214).41 This location was
quite significant because it shows the targeted main audience was not only non-Muslim subjects
and foreigners but also Muslim Turkish subjects. This intended audience demonstrates that the
theatres not only attracted minority groups, but that Western style of arts became so popular that
theatres were established in even highly populated Muslim neighbourhoods."

References

1866 establishments in the Ottoman Empire
Theatres in Istanbul
Theatre in the Ottoman Empire
Theatres completed in 1866
19th-century architecture in Turkey